The German School Nairobi is a German international school in Nairobi, Kenya. As of 2015 there are 182 students from 30 countries. The school has a twelve-year programme from primary school to upper secondary. The German School Society of Nairobi was founded in 1964 and the school itself was founded in 1969.

References

External links

 German School Nairobi
  German School Nairobi

International schools in Nairobi
Nairobi
1969 establishments in Kenya
Educational institutions established in 1969
Private schools in Kenya